Pierre Amélie Gustave de Clausade de Saint Amarand (25 August 1815 – 29 July 1888) was a 19th-century French lawyer, historian, and a member of the Société des Antiquaires de France.

Main works 
1835: Un voyages d’artiste, guide dans les Pyrénées par deux amis, Anonymous (Gustave de Clausade and Eugène de Malbos), Dagalier, Toulouse.
1843: Une Visite au bon Henry, suivie d'une excursion en Guipuscoa par Bayonne, text by G. de C., drawings by Eugène de Malbos, Toulouse.
1843: Poésies Languedociennes et Françaises d'Auger Gaillard,
1859: Le Château de Bruniquel sous Baudouin de Toulouse, par Gustave de Clausade, extrait des Mémoires de l’Académie des Sciences Inscriptions et Belles-Lettres de Toulouse, 1859

.

References 

1815 births
1888 deaths
People from Tarn (department)
19th-century French historians